This is a list of notable blue-eyed soul artists. Blue-eyed soul (also known as white soul) is soul music or rhythm and blues performed by white artists.

A

Adele
Christina Aguilera
Anastacia
The Animals
Rick Astley
Atlanta Rhythm Section
Atomic Rooster
Average White Band

B

Jon B.
Len Barry
Bee Gees
Cliff Bennett and the Rebel Rousers
Blue Zone
Michael Bolton
David Bowie
The Box Tops
Boy George
Tim Buckley

C

Bobby Caldwell
Lewis Capaldi
Paul Carrack
Alex Chilton
Gabriella Cilmi
Chris Clark
Wayne Cochran
Joe Cocker
The Commitments
Culture Club

D

Bill Deal
Dion
The Doobie Brothers
Duffy

F

Chris Farlowe
The Flaming Ember
John Fred

G
Go West

H

Hall & Oates
Roy Head
Taylor Hicks

J

Elton John 
Tom Jones

K
Kokomo

L

Ivy Levan
Lulu

M

Lonnie Mack
Teena Marie
Maroon 5
Michael McDonald
George Michael
Jason Mraz

N

John Németh
Paolo Nutini
Nathaniel Rateliff and the Night Sweats
Laura Nyro

P
Robert Palmer

R

Rag'n'Bone Man
The Rascals
Conner Reeves
The Righteous Brothers
Johnny Rivers
Todd Rundgren
Mitch Ryder

S

Evie Sands 
Boz Scaggs
Simply Red
Sam Smith 
The Soul Survivors
The Spencer Davis Group
Dusty Springfield
Rod Stewart
Joss Stone

T

Robin Thicke
Three Dog Night
Justin Timberlake

V
Van Morrison

W

ZZ Ward
Tony Joe White
Amy Winehouse
Wild Cherry
Steve Winwood

Y
Paul Young

References

Bibliography

Blue-eyed soul